Contrail (foaled 1 April 2017) is a champion Japanese Thoroughbred racehorse who won the Japanese Triple Crown in 2020. He was one of the leading two-year-olds in Japan in 2019 when he was undefeated in three races including the Tokyo Sports Hai Nisai Stakes and Hopeful Stakes. In 2020 he maintained his unbeaten record with wins in the Satsuki Sho, Tokyo Yushun and Kobe Shimbun Hai before completing the Japan Triple Crown with a victory in the Kikuka Sho. He came second in the 2020 Japan Cup to champion older mare Almond Eye, winner of the 2018 Japanese Fillies Triple Crown.

Background
Contrail is a brown horse with a white star bred in Japan by North Hills Co Ltd. He races in the colours of North Hills' owner Shinji Maeda and was sent into training with Yoshito Yahagi. He is a relatively small male Thoroughbred weighing no more than 460 kg during his racing career.

He was from the ninth crop of foals sired by Deep Impact, who was the Japanese Horse of the Year in 2005 and 2006, winning races including the Tokyo Yushun, Tenno Sho, Arima Kinen and Japan Cup. Deep Impact's other progeny include Gentildonna, Harp Star, Kizuna, A Shin Hikari, Marialite and Saxon Warrior.

Contrail's dam Rhodochrosite was bred in Kentucky but exported to Japan after being sold for $385,000 at the Keeneland Association Yearling Sale in September 2011. She showed little racing ability in her new country, failing to win in seven attempts. Her dam Folklore was a top-class performer in the United States, winning the Breeders' Cup Juvenile Fillies in 2005 and was a female-line descendant of the broodmare Stolen Base (foaled 1967), making her a distant relative of Smarty Jones.

Racing career

2019: two-year-old season
Contrail made his racecourse debut in a contest for previously unraced juveniles over 1800 metres at Hanshin Racecourse on 15 September and won from the filly Frevo and seven others. On 16 November the colt was stepped up in class for the Grade 3 Tokyo Sports Hai Nisai Stakes over 1800 metres at Tokyo Racecourse in which he was ridden by Ryan Moore and started the 1.5/1 favourite in an eight-runner field. After racing in fifth place he moved forward on the outside approaching the final turn, took the lead 400 metres from the finish and drew away to win by five lengths from Al Jannah. His winning time of 1:44.5 was a new record for the race.

Contrail was moved up to the highest class and started favourite for the Hopeful Stakes over 2000 metres at Nakayama Racecourse on 28 December when he was ridden by Yuichi Fukunaga. His twelve opponents included Wakea (winner of the Ivy Stakes), Weltreisende (Hagi Stakes), Authority (Fuyo Stakes) and Black Hole (Sapporo Nisai Stakes). After settling in fourth place behind the outsiders Panthalassa, Blooming Sky and Rhineback, Contrail moved up on the final turn, took the lead 200 metres from the finish and won "effortlessly" by one and a half lengths from Weltreisende. After the race Fukunaga said "He was really strong. I didn’t have to do anything but just sit on him... I was confident that we could make it through to the end. He does tend to be a little keen but the training staff had conditioned him to be in a good motivated mood so it worked well in the race. He really changed his gear effortlessly but did [look] a little lost once up front... the colt really showed his potential towards his three-year-old campaign next year."

In January 2020, at the JRA Awards for 2019, Contrail was named Best Two-Year-Old Colt, beating Salios by 197 votes to 77. In the official Japanese rankings however, Salios was rated the best two-year-old of 2019, one pound ahead of Contrail.

2020: three-year-old season

Contrail did not contest any trial races in the early spring of 2020 and made his three-year-old debut in the 80th running of the Satsuki Sho over 2000 metres at Nakayama on 19 April. Ridden by Fukunaga he started the 17/10 favourite ahead of Satono Flag (Yayoi Sho) and Salios in an eighteen-runner field which also included Weltreisende, Black Hole, Crystal Black (Keisei Stakes), Darlington Hall (Tokinominoru Kinen), My Rhapsody (Kyoto Nisai Stakes), Galore Creek (Spring Stakes) and Cortesia (Kisaragi Sho). The favourite raced towards the rear of the field on the inside rail as Chimera Verite set the pace, before switching to the outside as the runners approached the final turn. He produced strong late run, got the better of a sustained struggle with Salios and won by half a length, with three and a half lengths back to Galore Creek in third. After the race Fukunaga said "The race itself wasn't the way as I had expected... he wasn't keen to go up front early and I didn't push him so we were positioned much farther behind going around the second corner... but with the way he was moving in the post parade and the response once I took him to the outside, I had every confidence in him entering the stretch. His power was so that I thought we might pull away but Salios didn't let us win so easily. Winning the way he did today, I am confident that he has every reason to handle the extended distance in the Tokyo Yushun".

On 31 May Contrail was stepped up in distance to contest the 87th edition of the Tokyo Yushun over 2400 Metres at Tokyo and headed the betting at odds of 2/5. Salios was the second choice while the other sixteen runners included Wakea, Satono Flag, Darlington Hall, Galore Creek, Deep Bond (Kyoto Shimbun Hai), Satono Impresa (Mainichi Hai), Weltreisende, My Rhapsody, Cortesia and Black Hole. Contrail raced in third place as Win Carnelian set a steady pace before My Rhapsody rushed up on the outside to take the lead at half way. The favourite exited the final turn in fourth place, made rapid progress down the centre of the straight, took the lead 200 metres from the finish and drew away in the closing stages to come home three lengths clear of Salios. Fukunaga commented "I was just focusing on finishing this race on a high note and although he still has room for improvement— he tends to lose his focus when he's leading— he still is able to win like he did today, so he's got great potential and there's a lot to look forward to in this colt".

After the summer break Contrail returned to the track in the Grade 2 Kobe Shimbun Hai over 2200 metres at Chukyo Racecourse on 27 September and started the 1/10 favourite in a field of eighteen. He raced in mid division before taking the lead in the straight and broke clear to win by two lengths from Weltreisende. His assistant trainer Yusaku Oka subsequently commented "It was a good win... he were relieved by that". Four weeks later at Kyoto Racecourse the colt was stepped up in distance and attempted to complete the Japanese Triple Crown in the 3000 metre Kikuka Sho in which he was ridden as usual by Fukunaga. He was again made the 1/10 favourite, with the best-fancied of the other seventeen contenders being Weltreisende, Babbitt (St Lite Kinen), Aristoteles, Satono Flag, Valcos and Deep Bond. After settling behind the leaders as the outsider Chimera Verite set a steady pace, the favourite moved up on the outside approaching the straight and gained the advantage 300 metres from the finish. Contrail was strongly challenged by Aristoteles but kept on well to prevail by a neck with the pair finishing well clear of Satono Flag in third place. After the race Fukunaga commented "I can’t say that I was successful in keeping him relaxed during the race with so much pressure from Aristoteles. It turned out to be a tough race for us with Aristoteles looking quite strong and persistent, and this race may not have been his best performance, but I kept my faith in Contrail and he certainly showed how strong he is". He became only the third colt after Deep Impact and Symboli Rudolf to complete the Triple Crown while still undefeated.

On November 29, Contrail was matched against older horses for the first time when he started second favourite for the 40th edition of the Japan Cup over 2400 metres at Tokyo. He settled in mid-division before launching a strong late challenge down the centre of the straight but failed to catch the favoured Almond Eye and sustained his first defeat as he was beaten one and a quarter lengths into second place. The 2020 Japanese Fillies Triple Crown winner Daring Tact finished third, while the other runners included Glory Vase, World Premiere, Kiseki and Makahiki. Fukunaga commented about Contrail that "He never gave up but Almond Eye was strong. The result was regrettable, but his condition was good and he showed his ability."

In January 2021 Contrail was unanimously voted Best Three-Year-Old Colt at the JRA Awards for 2020. In the 2020 World's Best Racehorse Rankings, Contrail was rated on 124, making him the equal tenth best racehorse in the world and the best three-year-old over long distances.

Pedigree

See also
 List of historical horses

References

2017 racehorse births
Racehorses bred in Japan
Racehorses trained in Japan
Thoroughbred family 1-x
Triple Crown of Thoroughbred Racing winners